The Society of Polymer Science is a Japanese non-profit organization that studies polymer science with a focus on Japan but also internationally. The Society of Polymer Science was established in 1951 and currently has about 12,000 members. The society issues a monthly academic journal, the Polymer Journal.

References

Chemistry societies
1951 establishments in Japan
Scientific organizations established in 1951
Scientific organizations based in Japan